The ASI has recognized 366 Monuments of National Importance in Lucknow circle of Uttar Pradesh. For technical reasons, this list of Archaeological Survey of India recognized monuments in the Lucknow circle has been split into three lists: 
 Lalitpur district (this list)
 Northern districts in Lucknow circle: Ambedkar Nagar, Bahraich, Balrampur, Faizabad, Gonda, Hardoi, Kanpur Nagar, Kanpur Dehat, Kheri, Lucknow, Rae Bareli, Siddharthnagar, Shravasti, Sultanpur Pratapgarh and Unnao.
 Southern districts in Lucknow circle: Allahabad, Banda, Chitrakoot, Fatehpur, Hamirpur, Jalaun, Jhansi, Kaushambi and Mahoba.

List of monuments 

|}

See also 
 List of Monuments of National Importance in Agra district
 List of Monuments of National Importance in Agra circle
 List of Monuments of National Importance in Patna circle in Uttar Pradesh
 List of Monuments of National Importance in India for other Monuments of National Importance in India
 List of State Protected Monuments in Uttar Pradesh

References 

Lalitpur
Monuments of National Importance